= Service for the Protection of the Constitutional Order of the Republika Srpska =

Service for the Protection of the Constitutional Order of the Republika Srpska or SZUU (Serbian: Служба за заштиту уставног уређења Републике Српске, Croatian: Služba za zaštitu ustavnog uređenja Republike Srpske; Bosnian: Služba za zaštitu ustavnog uređenja Republike Srpske) is the domestic intelligence and internal security agency of Republika Srpska, an entity of Bosnia and Herzegovina.

The SZUU is competent to carry out tasks related to: collecting data and preventing activities aimed at undermining or destroying the constitutional order and security of Republika Srpska, research, collection, processing and analysis of data and knowledge of importance for the security of Republika Srpska and informing the competent republican bodies and institutions about this data, as well as other tasks specified by law. Its seat is in Banja Luka.
